Vincent Lafforgue (born 20 January 1974) is a French mathematician who is active in algebraic geometry, especially in the Langlands program, and a CNRS "Directeur de Recherches" at the Institute Fourier in Grenoble. He is the younger brother of Fields Medalist Laurent Lafforgue.

Awards
He participated in the International Mathematical Olympiad and wrote two perfect papers in 1990 and 1991, making him one of only three French mathematicians to win two gold medals (besides Joseph Najnudel, 1997–98, and Aurélien Fourré, 2020-21). Lafforgue was an Invited Speaker of the ICM in 2002 in Beijing, China 
and a Plenary Speaker of the ICM in 2018 in Rio de Janeiro, Brazil. He was awarded the 2019 Breakthrough Prize in Mathematics
for his "elegant and groundbreaking contributions to the Langlands program in the function field case",
namely for establishing the Langlands Correspondence (the direction from automorphic forms to Galois representations) for connected reductive groups defined over global function fields.

References

External links
Personal webpage

1974 births
Living people
20th-century French mathematicians
21st-century French mathematicians
Algebraic geometers
Lycée Louis-le-Grand alumni
École Normale Supérieure alumni
University of Paris alumni
International Mathematical Olympiad participants
People from Antony, Hauts-de-Seine